Ghana National College is a senior high school in Cape Coast, Ghana.

Overview
Ghana National College was founded on 20 July 1948, staffed by dismissed teachers from St Augustine's College and Mfantsipim School. The college was founded by the first Ghanaian President Dr. Kwame Nkrumah using his own funds, for eight students who had been expelled by the British colonial administration from St Augustine's College. The expulsion resulted from a protest march, held in solidarity with Nkrumah, who was then imprisoned.

Notable alumni
In 2014 the college created a Hall of Fame to honour alumni. The first inductees were Francis Allotey, Samuel Sefa-Dedeh, Jophus Anamuah-Mensah, Anthony Annan-Prah, David Taylor, Lee Tandoh-Ocran and Kobby A. Koomson. Other notable alumni include:
Nana Aba Anamoah, media personality, news anchor and broadcaster
Kwesi Armah, formerly Ghana's High Commissioner to the United Kingdom
General Emmanuel Alexander Erskine, 1st UNIFIL Commander
Gladys Asmah – Former minister of Fisheries
Anthony Annan – Ghanaian international footballer / Schalke 04
Frank Abor Essel-Cobbah – Member of parliament during the second republic 
 Damoah – Ghanaian author
Ernest Debrah – Ghanaian politician, former minister for Food and Agriculture 
Kwame Gyewu-Kyem – Member of parliament of the first parliament of the fourth republic  
Diana Hamilton – Ghanaian musician
Winston Mensah-Wood – Former Chief of Defence Staff, and Chief of the Army Staff 
Charlotte Osei – lawyer and former chairperson of the Electoral Commission of Ghana
Abeiku Santana – radio and TV personality
Asiedu Walker – Ghanaian politician
Nana Owusu-Nkwantabisa – Academia 
Rahim Banda – actor and Free SHS Ambassador

References

External links
 Ghana National College website.
 http://www.facebook.com/groups/nananom

Boarding schools in Ghana
Cape Coast
Educational institutions established in 1948
1948 establishments in Gold Coast (British colony)